Zack Kennedy (born 15 May 1995) is an American tennis player.

Kennedy has a career high ATP doubles ranking of 818 achieved on 12 September 2016.

Kennedy made his ATP main draw debut at the 2016 BB&T Atlanta Open in the doubles draw partnering Christopher Eubanks. Kennedy plays college tennis at Georgia State University.

References

External links

1995 births
Living people
American male tennis players
Tennis players from Atlanta
Georgia State Panthers athletes
College men's tennis players in the United States